Christine Beckman is the Price Family Chair in Social Innovation and Professor at the University of Southern California, Price School of Public Policy. She is the current Editor at Administrative Science Quarterly.  She studies social innovation and inequality.

Early life and education 
Beckman holds a B.A. in Psychology, with distinction, an M.A. in Sociology, and a Ph.D. in Organizational Behavior from Stanford University. Her Ph.D Dissertation was called “Learning from difference: The influence of network partners on organizational learning.”

Career and research 
Beckman served on the faculty at the Robert H. Smith School of Business, University of Maryland, and the Paul Merage School of Business, University of California, Irvine. At UC Irvine, she was a Chancellor’s Fellow from 2008-2011 and Faculty Director of the Don Beall Center for Entrepreneurship and Innovation.

She studied the LA2050 Grants Challenge. She was the 2006 Western Academy of Management Ascendent Scholar.

Selected publications 
 Irene, H., Mair, J., & Beckman, C. M., "Researching Social Innovation: How the unit of analysis informs the questions we ask"; Rutgers Business Review, 7(2): 153-165; 2022.
 Beckman, C. M., Alternatives and Complements to Rationality; In C. M. Beckman (Ed.), Carnegie goes to California: Advancing and Celebrating the Work of James G. March (Research in the Sociology of Organizations). Emerald Publishing Limited, Bingley. ; 2021.
 Beckman, Christine M. and Melissa Mazmanian, Dreams of the Overworked: Living, Working, and Parenting in the Digital Age; Stanford University Press; 2020,  
 Mazmanian, M. A., & Beckman, C. M., "Making your numbers: Engendering Organizational Control through a Ritual of Quantification"; Organization Science; 2019.

References

External links 

 Official website
 Ep 170. Christine Beckman: Living, Working and Parenting in the Digital Age Work and Life with Stew Friedman, 6/20/2020
 Impact on the Working Family During COVID-19 USC Price,  June 19, 2020

University of Southern California faculty

Living people
Year of birth missing (living people)

Stanford University alumni
University of California, Irvine alumni